Midtown 120 Blues is a 2008 deep house album by Terre Thaemlitz under the name DJ Sprinkles.

It was reissued in 2014 by Thaemlitz's Comatonse Recordings.

Themes
Midtown 120 Blues is a treatise on deep house's origins and its erasure by mainstream culture.  Track one, "Midtown 120 Intro", begins with a voiceover from Thaemlitz laying out these themes.There must be a hundred records with voice-overs asking, "What is house?" The answer is always some greeting card bullshit about "life, love, happiness...." … House is not universal. House is hyper-specific … The contexts from which the deep house sound emerged are forgotten: sexual and gender crises, transgender sex work, black market hormones, drug and alcohol addiction, loneliness, racism, HIV, ACT UP, Tompkins Square Park, police brutality, queer-bashing, underpayment, unemployment and censorship — all at 120 beats per minute.Track three, "Ball'r (Madonna Free Zone)," ends with a speech detailing Thaemlitz' frustration with the Madonna song "Vogue," which Thaemlitz felt erased the context of the vogue dance that emerged from the largely queer, black, and Latino-oriented Harlem ballroom scene.When Madonna came out with her hit Vogue I knew it was over. She had taken a very specifically queer, transgender, Latino and African-American phenomenon and totally erased that context with her lyrics, "it makes no difference if you're black or white, if you're a boy or a girl." Madonna was taking in tons of money, while the Queen who actually taught her how to vogue sat before me in the club, strung out, depressed and broke. So if anybody requested Vogue or any other Madonna track, I told them, no, this is a Madonna-free zone! And as long as I'm DJing, you will not be allowed to vogue to the decontextualized, reified, corporatized, liberalized, neutralized, asexualized, re-genderized pop reflection of this dance floor's reality!

Reception

Midtown 120 Blues is widely regarded as an exemplary contemporary deep house album.  Resident Advisor, who named it their #1 album of 2009, called it "a classic in the deep house canon."  Pitchfork Media's Andrew Gaerig gave the 2014 Comatonse reissue "Best New Reissue," saying that "at its best, Midtown 120 Blues simultaneously acts as a corrective to house's ahistorical narrative and reminds us just how potent and beautiful New York deep house can be."

Track listing

References 

2008 albums